Lutidinic acid (pyridine-2,4-dicarboxylic acid) is an heterocyclic organic compound, more precisely a heteroaromatic. It belongs to the group of pyridine dicarboxylic acids and consists of a pyridine ring which carries two carboxy groups in the 2- and 4-position.

Literature 
 Hans Meyer, Hans Tropsch: Über Derivate der Lutidinsäure und das αγ-Diaminopyridin; Monatshefte für Chemie. 35, 1914, pp. 189–206, .
 Richard Wolffenstein: Die Pflanzenalkaloide, 3. Auflage, Berlin 1922, S. 67.

References 

Pyridines
Dicarboxylic acids
Aromatic acids